The 1953 All-Pacific Coast football team consists of American football players chosen by various organizations for All-Pacific Coast teams for the 1953 college football season.

Selections

Backs
 Bobby Garrett, Stanford (AP-1; UP-1; TW)
 Paul Cameron, UCLA (AP-1; UP-1; TW)
 George Shaw , Oregon (AP-1; UP-1; TW)
 Paul Larson, California (UP-1; TW)
 Aramis Dandoy, USC (AP-1)

Ends
 Sam Morley, Stanford (AP-1; UP-1; TW)
 John Steinberg, Stanford (AP-1; UP-1; TW)

Tackles
 Charles "Chuck" Doud, UCLA (AP-1; UP-1)
 Duane Wardlow, Washington (AP-1)
 Jack Ellena, UCLA (UP-1; TW)
 Mario Da Re, USC (TW)

Guards
 Milt Bohart, Washington (AP-1; UP-1; TW)
 George Timberlake, USC (AP-1; UP-1; TW)

Centers
 Ron Pheister, Oregon (AP-1; UP-1; TW)

Key

AP = Associated Press, selected by the AP with the cooperation of the conference coaches

UP = United Press

TW = Tide Water Associated Oil Co., selected by Tide Water Associated sportscasters, commentators and producers

See also
1953 College Football All-America Team

References

All-Pacific Coast Football Team
All-Pacific Coast football teams
All-Pac-12 Conference football teams